National Tertiary Route 401, or just Route 401 (or ) is a National Road Route of Costa Rica, located in the Cartago province.

Description
In Cartago province the route covers Cartago canton (Tierra Blanca, Llano Grande districts), Oreamuno canton (Potrero Cerrado district).

References

Highways in Costa Rica